Toussaint L'Ouverture Allen (June 7, 1896 – March 3, 1960) was an American baseball first baseman in the Negro leagues.

He played from 1914 to 1928 with several teams. He played the majority of his career with the Hilldale Club.

References

External links
 and Baseball-Reference Black Baseball Stats and  Seamheads

1896 births
1960 deaths
Bacharach Giants players
Hilldale Club players
Newark Stars players
Philadelphia Tigers players
Wilmington Potomacs players
Baseball players from Georgia (U.S. state)
20th-century African-American sportspeople
Baseball infielders